Connellia augustae is a plant species in the genus Connellia. This species is native to Venezuela.

References

augustae
Flora of Venezuela
Taxa named by N. E. Brown